In a Biskit is a line of snack crackers produced by Nabisco. Originally released in the United States as Chicken in a Biskit in early 1964, the line has since grown to be available internationally with a variety of flavours.

United States version 
In the U.S., the product was flavored with dehydrated cooked chicken, but international formulations differ because of varied manufacturing.

In the United States, the Chicken in a Biskit and Swiss in a Biskit variants were part of a line of crackers known as Flavor Originals that included Better Cheddars, Sociables and Vegetable Thins. Chicken in a Biskit was available in original and barbecue flavours.

Australian version
In Australia, Nabisco also produced Vegemite, bacon and nacho flavoured "biskits", as well as more traditional flavours such as barbecue, crispy potato and salt and vinegar. In a Biskit crackers were packaged in a 175–200 gram box or a "Multi-pack" containing 10 bags of 25 grams each. Multi-packs were used in several Nabisco products and were introduced as part of the In a Biskit line in August 1999. The line was made at Kraft's Broadmeadows factory until its closure in 2006. Manufacturing was moved to China. While Australian Kraft Chicken in a Biskit listed chicken meat among the ingredients, an independent chemistry assay detected "no protein from any meat species" in the product.

Production of the 'In a Biskit' range was discontinued in March 2015. In a Biskit returned to Australian shelves in August 2021 for a limited time with Chicken and Drumstix flavours. In August 2022, Mondelez announced it would release three new flavours inspired by Australian home delivery — Smoky Meatlovers, Cheese Burger and Loaded Cheese.

See also

 List of crackers

References

External links

 
 Flavor Originals (archive) at Nabisco's International website.

Brand name crackers
Nabisco brands
Chicken as food